G. E. Street (1824–81) was an English architect and architectural writer, whose designs were mainly in High Victorian Gothic style.  Born the son of a solicitor, he first worked in a law office, but was then articled to the architect Owen Browne Carter in Winchester.  Two years later, in 1844, he moved to London and worked in the office of George Gilbert Scott.  Here he also worked with George Frederick Bodley and William White.  Street established his own architectural practice in 1849, initially in London, and later in Wantage (then in Berkshire).  He was appointed as architect to the diocese of Oxford in 1850, and retained this position until his death. He married in 1852 and in that year moved to Oxford.  He returned to London in 1856 and maintained an office there for the remainder of his career.  He travelled extensively, visiting the Continent of Europe frequently.  Street was also a prolific writer on architectural subjects.  He was a member of the Royal Academy, and in 1874 was awarded the Royal Gold Medal of the Royal Institute of British Architects, being its president in 1881.

Most of Street's works were in relation to churches; designing new churches, restoring and making additions and alterations to existing churches, and designing fittings and furnishings for them.  He also designed domestic buildings, especially vicarages, and schools with houses for the schoolmaster.  He designed little in the way of public buildings, although towards the end of his life he designed what has been described as his "greatest commission", the Royal Courts of Justice in London.  Most of his works were in England, especially within and close to the diocese of Oxford, but examples of his work can be found throughout England, Wales and Ireland.  He also designed some buildings abroad, including a church in Constantinople.  Almost all his designs are in Gothic Revival style, in particular, in what is known as the High Victorian style.  This style came chronologically after the use of "pure" and "correct" use of features of English Gothic architecture, which had been championed by A. W. N. Pugin and the Ecclesiological Society.  High Victorian incorporated the use of polychromy, and elements of Continental forms of Gothic architecture.  Street died in 1881, and was buried in Westminster Abbey.

This list contains details of Street's work on domestic buildings in England and Scotland.

Key

Works

See also
List of new churches by G. E. Street
List of church restorations and alterations by G. E. Street
List of miscellaneous works by G. E. Street

References

Bibliography